The following is a list of bases of the South African Air Force.

Current Bases

Disbanded Bases

See also
South African Air Force
List of aircraft of the South African Air Force
List of squadrons of the South African Air Force

Notes

External links
Map of air force bases at www.af.mil.za

Bases of the South African Air Force
Lists
South Africa